Racheltjie de Beer is a 2019 Afrikaans film about a young Afrikaner girl, Racheltjie de Beer in the Voortrekker-era who sacrificed herself to save her brother. The director is Matthys Boshoff and the producer is Johan Kruger. The screenplay was written by Brett Michael Innes and Matthys Boshoff.

The film was produced in the Eastern Free State (Fouriesburg area).

Cast 

 Herman de Beer - Stian Bam
 Racheltjie de Beer - Zonika de Vries
 Jamie de Beer - Johannes Jordaan
 George Lundt - Marius Weyers

The cast also includes Sandra Prinsloo and Antoinette Louw.

Release 
The film premiered  at the Silver Screen Festival at Camps Bay. Stian Bam won a Silver Screen Award for his performance as Racheltjie's father. It is scheduled to compete under the title Children of the Storm (Racheltjie de Beer) in the Narrative Competition at the San Diego International Film Festival in October 2020. The movie is also called Storm Riders for its North American release.

See also 

 Racheltjie de Beer
 List of Afrikaans-language films

References

External links 

 

Afrikaans-language films
South African drama films
2019 drama films